The Soloneț is a right tributary of the river Suceava in Romania. It discharges into the Suceava in Părhăuți. It flows through the villages Solonețu Nou, Pârteștii de Sus, Pârteștii de Jos, Humoreni, Comănești, Soloneț, Todirești and Părhăuți.

References

Rivers of Romania
Rivers of Suceava County